United States Tour Operators Association (USTOA) is a 501(c) registered nonprofit professional association representing the tour operator industry. Its members are made up of companies who provide services worldwide but who conduct business in the U.S. As a voice for the tour operator industry, USTOA represents this sector in matters pertaining to the travel industry as a whole, both in the U.S. and abroad. Among USTOA's goals are consumer protection and education, and its standards and work in this area have earned USTOA the endorsement of the United States Government's Consumer Action Handbook.

USTOA member companies must meet a number of ethical and financial criteria, including participation in the USTOA $1 Million Travelers Assistance Program, which among other things protects consumer payments up to $1 million in case the company files for bankruptcy, insolvency or cessation of business.

USTOA was one of many travel industry nonprofit associations, along with ASTA, U.S. Travel, and more, to advocate for the end of the U.S.'s inbound pre-travel testing requirement in 2022.

References

External links

Organizations based in New York City
Tourism in the United States
Traveling business organizations
Transportation associations in the United States
Organizations established in 1972
1972 establishments in New York City